Totapuri: Chapter 1 is a 2022 Indian Kannada-language romantic comedy film written and directed by Vijaya Prasad and produced by K A Suresh. The film stars Jaggesh, Dhananjay, Suman Ranganathan and Aditi Prabhudeva in the lead roles.

Premise 
Eeregowda is a farmer and tailor, who is specialist in Totapuri design clothes. He meets Shakeela Banu, a cashier and the duo fall for each other. After much thought, the two relucantly decide to inform the elders about their relationship fearing about issues based on their religion, caste and faith.

Cast 

 Jaggesh as Eeregowda, a farmer and tailor 
 Dhananjay
 Suman Ranganathan as Victoria
 Aditi Prabhudeva as Shakeela Banu
 H. G. Dattatreya as Imaam Saheb
 Veena Sundar as Rangamma
 Hema Dutta as Nanjamma

Release
Totapuri: Chapter 1 was released on 30 September 2022.

Home media 
The satellite and digital rights were sold to Zee Kannada and ZEE5. The film was digitally streamed on 23 December 2022 in ZEE5.

Reception 
Thotapuri: Chapter 1 received mixed reviews from critics.

Vinay Lokesh of The Times of India gave 3.5 out of 5 stars and wrote "Jaggesh’s films come with a ton of double entenders; Vijayaprasad, too, is known for his double-meaning comedy layered with philosophical undertones. And when they come together, one can only expect oodles of fun and Thothapuri Chapter 1 has a plenty of it." A Sharaadha of Cinema Express gave 3 out of 5 stars and wrote "Vijayaprasad has his own set of fans who like his way of writing or telling a story. But it is also time for the director to get out of his comfort zone, and bring in newness, without giving up on his signature style."

Swaroop Kodur of OTTplay gave 2 out of 5 stars and wrote "Thothapuri Chapter 1 is an endearing film at first glance but the persisting play on words, especially as double-entendres, is a major letdown as far as the overall experience is concerned. Sure, some of the jokes do land well and there's also an emotional core in the midst but Vijayaprasad's tried-and-tested filmmaking approach has perhaps gone stale now."

References

External links 
 

2020s Kannada-language films
Indian romantic comedy films
Films directed by Vijaya Prasad